Banque Zilkha S.A.L. was a Lebanese private bank, founded in 1946, and headquartered in Beirut. The bank was founded by the Zilkha family. Khedouri Zilkha (died 1956) was the head of the bank. In 1958, the bank merged into Société Bancaire du Liban S.A.L.

References

1946 establishments in Lebanon
Banks established in 1946
Defunct banks of Lebanon
Companies based in Beirut
1958 disestablishments in Asia